"Sour Times" is a song by English trip hop group Portishead, from their debut album, Dummy (1994). It was written by all three members of the band and released as a single by Go! Beat Records in August 1994, accompanied by three bonus tracks: "It's a Fire", "Pedestal", and "Theme from To Kill a Dead Man". NME ranked it number 32 in their list of the 50 best songs of 1994. Slant Magazine placed it at number 77 in their ranking of "The 100 Best Singles of the 1990s" in 2011.

Composition
The song uses a sample from Argentine composer Lalo Schifrin's "Danube Incident", from the 1967 album, More Mission: Impossible. Portishead sped up the sample  to a desired tempo which took Schifrin's arrangement up nearly a semitone, giving the song a dissonant kind of "hip-hop tuning”.

Critical reception
Dave Sholin from the Gavin Report described the song as a "moody, mysterious and haunting production." Chuck Campbell from Knoxville News Sentinel felt the "stalking" track is "a modern rock hit that could bloom into more for the English band, but the single's relative directness doesn't accurately reflect the more obscure path the group favors." In his weekly UK chart commentary, James Masterton wrote, "Its the kind of gloriously understated piece of melancholia that is normally supposed to appeal to students but is actually far too good to be wasted solely on that market." Alan Jones from Music Week gave the song four out of five, adding, "Their first single, "Numb", was a non-starter, but Portishead make a quantum jump with this single. This is a melancholy, wistful and worthy successor to the widescreen meanderings of fellow Bristolians Massive Attack, with a soulful vocal and tense backing track that evokes Bond movies and Spaghetti Westerns in equal measure. A spinechiller, and a hit." 

Another editor, Andy Beevers, stated, "Hot on the heels of their critically acclaimed "Numb", the Bristol duo are re-releasing this single which first appeared as a very limited self-financed white label several months back. It is another moody downbeat tune featuring melancholy vocals, although it is a less leftfield and more complete song than "Numb"." James Hamilton from the RM Dance Update declared it as a "tremulous gentle girl sighed doodling atmospheric Twin Peaks/From Russia With Love-ish 94bpm pop swayer". Charles Aaron from Spin wrote, "Figures it would take two pale British hip-hop heads to finally dream up some modern lounge music that doesn't sound totally deracinated or desexed." Another editor, Jonathan Bernstein, viewed it as the group's "most wistful song", remarking that it's "fraught with anticipation of impending calamity, in part due to the employment of a theremin, the device the Beach Boys used to make "Good Vibrations" sound so spooky."

Music video
The accompanying music video for "Sour Times" is made of footage from Portishead's short film To Kill a Dead Man. It was directed by Alexander Hemming.

Release
"Sour Times" was released as the second single from Dummy on 1 August 1994. It initially reached only number 57 in the UK Singles Chart, but after the success of "Glory Box" in 1995, it was re-released and peaked at number 13 in April. It is also the band's only song to date to appear on the Billboard Hot 100 chart, at number 53. "Sour Times" was the band's first entry on the Australian ARIA top 100 singles chart, peaking at number 66 in March 1995. The B-side track "Airbus Reconstruction" was actually recorded by the band Airbus, who were former school friends of Geoff Barrow.

Track listings
 CD 1
 "Sour Times" (4:14)
 "It's a Fire" (3:47)
 "Pedestal" (3:41)
 "Theme from To Kill a Dead Man" (4:25)

 CD 2
 "Sour Times" (edit) (3:25)
 "Sour Sour Times" (5:49)
 "Lot More" (4:21)
 "Sheared Times" (4:03)
 "Airbus Reconstruction" (5:08)
 Although they bear new titles, all tracks on CD 2 are remixes of "Sour Times"

Charts

Certifications

Covers and in popular culture
The Blank Theory covered "Sour Times" on their Beyond the Calm of the Corridor release, which was featured in the trailer for Wicker Park.

"Sour Times" was used as the theme music to the ITV drama series The Vice, and also appeared in the films Assassins and Killing Time in addition to the TV shows Warehouse 13 and The People v. O.J. Simpson: American Crime Story.

The song was sampled in the 2004 single "Teardrops" by the 411.

The name of Turkish social network Ekşi Sözlük was derived from "Sour Times". This network was founded as a part of sourtimes.org in 1999.

English singer Marsha Ambrosius covered the song on her 2011 album Late Nights & Early Mornings.

References

External links
 

1994 singles
Portishead (band) songs
Songs written by Geoff Barrow
Songs written by Beth Gibbons
Songs written by Adrian Utley
Go! Discs singles
1994 songs
Lalo Schifrin